"Coupable" (meaning Guilty in French) is a 1973 French-language song and hit single by French singer Jean-François Michael. Lyrics were written by Yves Dessca and music is by the Lebanese composers the Rahbani Brothers (Mansour and Assi Rahbani).

Habbaytak bilsayf
The music of the song is taken from a big 1970 Arabic language hit titled "Habbaytak bilsayf" (in Arabic حبّيتك بالصيف) co-written by the Rahbanis and sung by the Lebanese diva Fairuz (Feyrouz) wife of the song composer Assi Rahbani. Although the music in the two songs is identical, the lyrics are totally unrelated to each other as the Arabic language version "Habbaytak bilsayf" means "I loved you in the summer".

French-language songs